"We Come 1" is a song by British electronic band Faithless from their third studio album, Outrospective (2001). The song was issued as the album's lead single on 4 June 2001, two weeks before Outrospective was released. The remixes by Wookie and Dave Clarke that appear on the single releases are included on the bonus disc of the album Reperspective: The Remixes.

"We Come 1" reached number three in the United Kingdom, making it the joint-highest-charting Faithless song on the UK Singles Chart along with the 1996 re-release of "Insomnia". The single also reached the top three in Denmark, Greece, Hungary, the Netherlands, Norway, and Romania. A music video directed by Dom and Nic was created for the track. The song re-charted at number 70 on the UK Singles Downloads Chart after the death of Maxi Jazz in December 2022.

Composition
The lyrics of "We Come 1", sung by Maxi Jazz, possess a theme of unity. In the song, the narrator sings to someone upon which he is dependent, but this dependency is not based on external factors. Instead, this person provides internal inspiration, including the narrator's purpose in life. Whenever the two individuals are together, they are able to cooperate to stand for or against an ambiguous concept that the song does not identify. The relationship between the two people is also left vague, but the narrator's message insists that whenever they team up, they are one complete entity, and the narrator believes that his other half is what he stands for.

Primarily, "We Come 1" advocates all people to consolidate. During live performances of the song, Maxi Jazz often urges the audience to take care of their brethren, stating, "We're all we got." Sister Bliss said in an interview with Bulgaria's MMTV that "We Come 1" is a humane track that illustrates the relationships between everything on the planet. As a result, Sister Bliss stated that protecting these relationships is what keeps concepts such as nature and the environment viable, saying, "We must come one otherwise our future is in peril."

Critical reception
Miriam Hubner of Music & Media called "We Come 1" a "fervent love song" and called its production "smooth". Andy Hermann of online magazine PopMatters wrote that the song is an "obvious attempt to follow up the international club success of 'God Is a DJ'", praising its riff and production but noting that it "hardly rocks your world". Reviewing the album on AllMusic, Dean Carlson labelled the track a "sagging comeback single", comparing it to a mundane version of the Underworld song "Oich Oich" (1996).

Track listings

UK CD1
 "We Come 1" (radio edit) – 3:44
 "We Come 1" (Rollo & Sister Bliss remix) – 8:06
 "We Come 1" (Dave Clarke remix) – 5:22

UK CD2
 "We Come 1" (radio edit) – 3:46
 "We Come 1" (Wookie remix) – 5:53
 "We Come 1" (Rocket vs Jeno remix) – 7:55

European CD single
 "We Come 1" (radio edit) – 3:43
 "We Come 1" (Rollo & Sister Bliss remix) – 8:32

UK 12-inch single
 "We Come 1" (Rollo & Sister Bliss remix) – 8:32
 "We Come 1" (Eliot J remix) – 6:52

European maxi-CD single and Australian CD single
 "We Come 1" (radio mix) – 3:43
 "We Come 1" (Rollo & Sister Bliss mix) – 8:32
 "We Come 1" (Dave Clarke mix) – 6:04
 "We Come 1" (Wookie remix) – 5:50
 "We Come 1" (Rocket vs Jeno remix) – 7:55

Credits and personnel
Credits are adapted from the UK CD1 liner notes and the Outrospective booklet.

Studios
 Recorded at Swanyard Studios (London, England)
 Mixed at the Ark
 Mastered at the Exchange (London, England)

Personnel

 Maxi Jazz – writing, rap writing and performance
 Sister Bliss – writing, keyboards, production
 Rollo – writing, production, programming
 Andy Treacey – live drums
 Grippa – engineering, sonic enhancement

 Peanut – engineering and sonic enhancement assistant
 Guy Davie – mastering
 Simon Corkin – artwork design
 Ellis Parrinder – photography

Charts

Weekly charts

Year-end charts

Certifications

Release history

References

External links
 FaithlessWeb.com
 Faithless / Rollo / Sister Bliss & related artists - Unofficial Discography

2001 singles
2001 songs
Bertelsmann Music Group singles
Cheeky Records singles
Faithless songs
Songs written by Maxi Jazz
Songs written by Rollo Armstrong
Songs written by Sister Bliss